Evangelical environmentalism is an environmental movement in the United States in which some Evangelical Christians have emphasized biblical mandates concerning humanity's role as steward and subsequent responsibility for the care taking of Creation. While the movement has focused on different environmental issues, it is best known for its focus of addressing climate action from a biblically-grounded theological perspective.

Some Evangelical groups have allied with environmentalists in teaching knowledge and developing awareness of global warming. The National Association of Evangelicals, a nonprofit organization, is working to encourage lawmakers to pass a law that would put restrictions on carbon emissions in the United States.

Overview
Evangelical environmentalists are committed to the authority of the Bible. Drawing from Genesis 2:15 , humans are seen as caretakers (stewards) of God's Creation. Genesis  states: "And the LORD God took the man, and put him into the garden of Eden to dress it and to keep it." Richard T. Ritenbaugh writes, "Tend ('abad in Hebrew pronunciation) means "to work or serve", and thus referring to the ground or a garden, it can be defined as "to till or cultivate". It possesses the nuance seen in the King James Version's choice in its translation: "dress", implying adornment, embellishment, and improvement. Keep (Hebrew shamar) means "to exercise great care over".

From an Evangelical environmentalist perspective, the response to the ecological crisis involves the restoration of correct doctrine, the restoration of Christianity as guide, and a balancing of the Bible and biology. It is important to Evangelical environmentalists that they are not seen as worshiping nature; they feel obligated to the stewardship of creation because of their focus on the creator of nature.

In Green Like God: Unlocking the Divine Plan for Our Planet Merritt states the Noah Covenant is God entering a Covenant with all the Earth by citing Gen 9:9-10.  Merritt continues from Gen 2:15 ...
 "Cultivate it and keep it" New American Standard Bible
 "Tend it and watch over it" New Living Translation
 "Work it and keep it" English Standard Version
 "Take care of it and to look after it" Holman Christian Standard Bible
 "Till it and watch keep it" Revised Standard Version
 "Work the ground and keep it in order" The Message (Bible)

Specific actions
Many American religious organizations have a long record of opposing nuclear weapons. Rejecting the development and use of nuclear weapons is "...one of the most widely shared convictions across faith traditions". In the 1980s religious groups organized large anti-nuclear protests involving hundreds of thousands of people, and specific groups involved included the Southern Baptist Convention and the Episcopal Church.

In February 2006, a group of 86 notable U.S. evangelical Christian leaders launched the Evangelical Climate Initiative, a campaign for environmental reform, calling on all Christians to push for federal legislation that would reduce carbon dioxide emissions in an effort to stem global warming.

Televangelist Pat Robertson changed his stance on global warming. In October 2005, Robertson accused the Evangelical Climate Initiative of teaming up with "far-left environmentalists", but in the summer of 2006 on his 700 Club television show, Robertson stated that "they're making a convert out of me". He also said "We really need to address the burning of fossil fuels."

In March 2008, a group of Southern Baptist leaders issued a statement that their denomination had been timid when it came to environmental issues and that they have a duty to stop global warming. This declaration was signed by the President of the congregation. The Southern Baptist Convention is the largest Protestant denomination in the United States with 16.3 million members.

Michael Banach, the Vatican representative to the International Atomic Energy Agency, told a Vienna conference in 2011 that the Japanese Fukushima nuclear disaster created new safety concerns about nuclear plants globally. Auxiliary bishop of Osaka Michael Goro Matsuura said this nuclear power disaster should encourage Japan and other countries to abandon nuclear projects. He called on worldwide Christian solidarity to provide wide support for an anti-nuclear campaign. Statements from bishops' conferences in Korea and the Philippines called on their governments to abandon atomic power. Columban priest Fr Seán McDonagh has written a book entitled Is Fukushima the Death Knell for Nuclear Energy?. Nobel laureate Kenzaburō Ōe has said Japan should quickly abandon its nuclear reactors.

The congregation of Englewood Christian Church in Indianapolis, Indiana has a "creation care" mission of green affordable housing initiatives, which include Oxford Senior Housing, the first net zero development in Indiana. In Indiana, although "the words "climate change" can be politically divisive, "creation care" is not." The Hoosier Interfaith Power and Light organization has started an initiative to help congregations install solar energy.

The US-based Evangelical Environmental Network has engaged in a number of candlelight vigils throughout the United States. Its youth ministry, Young Evangelicals for Climate Action (YECA), "aims to mobilize students, influence religious leaders and pressure lawmakers into passing legislation to address climate change." Other evangelical groups include the Evangelical Climate Initiative, Climate Caretakers, Care of Creation and A Rocha.

Members of Young Evangelicals for Climate Action participated in the September 2019 climate strikes at about a dozen colleges and universities, with a message of creation care and a faith-based approach to "speaking up for people's right to clean air and water and a stable climate."

Criticism
In January 2006, a group of evangelicals opposed the Evangelical Climate Initiative's stance and issued a letter to the NAE which stated that "global warming is not a consensus issue, and our love for the Creator and respect for His Creation does not require us to take a position [supporting a cap and trade tax increase]". In 2007 the New York Times reported, "leaders of the conservative Christian wing of the Republican Party, including James Dobson, Gary Bauer and Paul Weyrich, told the policy director of the NAE, the Rev. Richard Cizik, to shut up already about global warming".

Ann Coulter focuses on Genesis 1:27-28 which gives dominion to humanity over nature. Ann Coulter claims: "God gave us the earth. We have dominion over the plants, the animals, the trees. God said, 'Earth is yours. Take it. Rape it. It's yours.'" Lynn White (1967) implies that this is a common view among Christians, but the accuracy of this statement is debatable.

In 2008, a survey conducted by the Pew Forum on Religion and Public Life, found that 31% of white Evangelical Protestants did not believe that there is solid evidence showing that the Earth is warming. 34% of white Evangelical Protestants did believe that there was evidence, but 17% did not believe that warming was due to human impacts. 47% of the total U.S. population does believe that the Earth is warming because of human influences and 58% of unaffiliated Americans believe that global warming due to human impacts is real.

See also

 Anthropogenic hazard
 Christian views on environmentalism
 Cornwall Alliance
 Bill Moyers
 Public opinion on global warming
 The Green Bible

References

Further reading
Allen, R. S., E. Castano, and P. D. Allen. 2007. "Conservatism and concern for the environment". Quarterly Journal of Ideology 30(3/4):1–25.
Brown, Edward R. 2008. Our Father's World: Mobilizing the Church to Care for Creation (InterVarsity Press).
Guth, J. L., J. C. Green, L. A. Kellstedt, and C. E. Smidt. 1995. "Faith and the environment: religious beliefs and attitudes on environmental policy". American Journal of Political Science 39:364–382.
Konisky, D. M., J. Milyo, and L. E. Richardson, Jr. 2008. "Environmental policy attitudes: issues, geographic scale, and political trust". Social Science Quarterly 89:1066–1085.
McCright, A. M., and R. E. Dunlap. 2003. "Defeating Kyoto: the conservative movement's impact on U.S. climate change policy". Social Problems 50:348–373.
Merritt, Jonathan (2010) Green Like God: Unlocking the Divine Plan for Our Planet 
Peterson, M. N., and J. Liu. 2008. "Impacts of religion on environmental worldviews: the Teton Valley case". Society and Natural Resources 21:704–718.
Schultz, P. W., L. Zelezny, and N. J. Dalrymple. 2000. "A multinational perspective on the relation between Judeo-Christian religious beliefs and attitudes of environmental concern". Environment and Behavior 32:576–591.
Sherkat, D. E., and C. G. Ellison. 2007. "Structuring the religion-environment connection: identifying religious influences on environmental concern and activism". Journal for the Scientific Study of Religion 46:71–85.
Snyder, Howard A., and Joel Scandrett. 2011. Salvation Means Creation Healed: The Ecology of Sin and Grace (Cascade Books).
Wilkinson, Katharine K. 2012. Between God & Green: How Evangelicals Are Cultivating a Middle Ground on Climate Change (Oxford University Press).

External links 

Environmentalism in the United States
Evangelicalism
Christianity and environmentalism
Christian terminology
Environmental movements